Patricia "Pat" Strachota (born June 29, 1955) is a Wisconsin politician and legislator.  A Republican, she was a member of the Wisconsin State Assembly from 2005 to 2015, representing central Washington County.  She was majority leader from March 2014 through January 2015.

Biography

Born in Cuyahoga County, Ohio, Strachota graduated from St. Mary's College, South Bend, Indiana. She served on the Washington County, Wisconsin Board of Supervisors from 1986 to 2002. She worked for the Washington County Department of Human Resources as a personnel/safety analyst. She served in the Wisconsin State Assembly from 2005 to 2015.

In February 2014, Strachota announced she would not seek reelection.  A few weeks later, Republican Assembly majority leader Bill Kramer was accused of harassing two women during a trip to Washington, D.C.  The Republican caucus held an emergency meeting and voted to remove him from leadership and replace him with Strachota for the remainder of the term.

While serving in the legislature, she was a member of the American Legislative Exchange Council.

References

External links
 
 
 58th Assembly District map (2011–2021)

 

 

1955 births
Living people
County supervisors in Wisconsin
Republican Party members of the Wisconsin State Assembly
People from Cuyahoga County, Ohio
People from West Bend, Wisconsin
Saint Mary's College (Indiana) alumni
Women state legislators in Wisconsin
21st-century American politicians
21st-century American women politicians